Zamana is a 2010 Indian Kannada-language action drama film directed by Shankar Adithya. The plot revolves around a software professional (Nithish J. P.) leading a normal life, who gets entangled in the underworld led by circumstances. It also features Aakarsha and Jackie Shroff in pivotal roles while Sadhu Kokila, Vineeth Kumar and Sundar Raj appear in supporting roles. This movie was completed in 2008 but delayed for 2 years and finally released in 2010.

Cast 
The cast of the film:
 Nithish J. P. as Anil
 Aakarsha as Swati
 Jackie Shroff as Ramakanth Tyagi
 Sadhu Kokila
 Vineeth Kumar
 Leena Sidhu
 Sundar Raj
 Bharath Bhagavathar
 Patre Nagaraj
 Layendra
 Vaijanath Biradar
 Malathi Sardeshpande
 Sanjay Suri
 Muzahid Pasha

Production 
Zamana is the second Kannada film to feature Bollywood actor Jackie Shroff, who dubbed his own lines.

Music 

Karthik Raja scored the film's background music and for its soundtrack. Lyrics for the soundtrack were written by Sudarshan, Jayanth Kaikini, Tushar Ranganath and K. Kalyan.

Reception 
IANS stated that Shroff was the "only saving grace" in the film that was "marred by a loose script and a predictable story".

References

External links 
 

2010 films
2010s Kannada-language films
Indian action drama films
2010 action drama films
Films scored by Karthik Raja